Get Shorty is a 1995 American gangster comedy film directed by Barry Sonnenfeld and written by Scott Frank, based on Elmore Leonard's novel of the same name. The film stars John Travolta, Gene Hackman, Rene Russo, Delroy Lindo, James Gandolfini, Dennis Farina, and Danny DeVito. It follows Chili Palmer (Travolta), a Miami mobster and loan shark who inadvertently gets involved in Hollywood feature film production.

The sequel Be Cool was also based on an Elmore Leonard novel, released in 2005. In 2017, Get Shorty inspired a television series of the same name.

Plot
Ernesto "Chili" Palmer is a Miami-based loan shark and movie buff. When his leather jacket is taken by rival mobster Ray "Bones" Barboni, Chili retrieves it and breaks Bones' nose. Bones ambushes him at his office, but Chili shoots first, grazing Bones' forehead. Bones' boss refuses to retaliate, reminding him that Chili is under the protection of Brooklyn mob boss Momo.

After Momo dies of a heart attack, Bones takes over his operation and demands that Chili collect an outstanding debt from Leo Devoe, a dry cleaner who died in a plane crash. Chili learns from Leo's wife Faye that her husband is alive, having left the plane before takeoff; she received a settlement of $300,000, but Leo ran away with the cash. Chili tracks Leo to a Las Vegas casino and accepts an additional job to collect a large gaming debt from B movie director Harry Zimm.

Surprising Harry in Los Angeles at the home of scream queen Karen Flores, Chili pitches him his real-life chasing of Leo's debt as an idea for a movie. Harry persuades Chili to help him placate his investors Bo Catlett and Ronnie Wingate, who use their limo service as a drug front. Having gambled away the pair's $200,000 investment, Harry shows him the script he really wants to make, Mr. Lovejoy; he needs $500,000 to buy the rights from the writer's widow, Doris. Chili confronts Leo and takes his money to invest in the film, deciding to become a Hollywood producer, and rejects Bo's suggestion that they collaborate.

Bo has left $500,000 in a locker at Los Angeles International Airport for his Colombian contacts to collect. A naive gangster, Yayo Portillo, is sent to collect the money but refuses after Bo warns him that DEA agents are watching the locker. At Bo's cliffside home, Yayo threatens to inform on Bo if he is arrested with the cash; Bo shoots Yayo, knocking him over the deck railing, and plans to eliminate Chili in a similar fashion. He is later visited by Mr. Escobar, a Colombian drug lord who turns out to be Yayo's uncle, who demands full repayment.

Warming to Chili, Karen also wants to become a producer and arranges a meeting with Hollywood star Martin Weir, her ex-husband. Martin is intrigued by Chili's pitch and interested in playing Chili. Sensing that Harry is jealous of Chili and too stupid to realize he is being played, Bo offers him the locker money as a new investment, suggesting he send Chili to fetch it. Sensing a trap, Chili fakes out the DEA agents while confirming the presence of the money. He gets into a confrontation with Bo's enforcer, Bear, but the situation is defused when the two men start discussing Bear's former career as a stuntman.

After being seduced by Doris, Harry drunkenly calls Bones, insults him, and asks for another investment; he also reveals that Chili has Leo's money. Bones flies to Los Angeles and brutally beats Harry. When Ronnie interrupts them, Bones shoots him dead and plants the gun on Harry. Bear has a change of heart about the plan to kill Chili, but Bo threatens him and his young daughter. Chili and Karen give in to their mutual attraction and take a badly injured Harry to a lunch meeting with Martin.

Desperate to pay the Colombians, Bo resorts to kidnapping Karen and forcing Chili to give him Leo's money. Chili delivers the money, but Bo then orders Bear to beat him to death; during the fake scuffle, Bear maneuvers Bo into falling into a railing he had loosened earlier, thus making Bo's death look like an accident. Bones demands Leo's money at gunpoint. Chili tells him it is in the locker, and Bones walks into the DEA's trap. Sometime later, Get Shorty — the film within a film — is underway, produced by Chili and Karen, directed by Harry, starring Martin as Chili and Harvey Keitel as Bones, with Bear as stunt supervisor. When Martin's prop gun fails, Harry halts filming for the day, to Doris's displeasure as they are two weeks behind. Chili and Karen leave the lot.

Cast

 John Travolta as Chili Palmer
 Gene Hackman as Harry Zimm
 Rene Russo as Karen Flores
 Danny DeVito as Martin Weir
 Dennis Farina as Ray "Bones" Barboni
 Delroy Lindo as Bo Catlett
 James Gandolfini as Bear 
 Jon Gries as Ronnie Wingate 
 David Paymer and Linda Hart as Leo and Faye Devoe 
 Miguel Sandoval as Mr. Escobar
 Jacob Vargas as Yayo Portillo
 Bette Midler as Doris Saffron
 Martin Ferrero as Tommy Carlo
 Renee Props as Nicki
 Bobby Slayton as Dick Allen
 Ron Karabatsos as Momo
 Jack Conley as Agent Dunbar
 Bernard Hocke as Agent Morgan
 Rino Piccolo as Waiter at Vesuvio's
 Alfred Dennis as Ed the Barber
 Ralph Manza as Fred the Barber
 Patrick Breen as Assistant Doctor
 Barry Sonnenfeld as Doorman
 Rebeca Arthur as Las Vegas Waitress
 Leslie Bega as Vikki Vespa (uncredited)
 David Groh as Buddy Lipton (uncredited)
 Harvey Keitel as Harvey Keitel (uncredited)
 Penny Marshall as Penny Marshall (uncredited)
 Alex Rocco as Jimmy Capp (Ray Bones' Boss) (uncredited)

Get Shorty also features an appearance from the real Ernest "Chili" Palmer, a Miami loan shark and mob-connected man who inspired the original character.

Soundtrack
The movie features an acid- and soul-jazz themed soundtrack with songs by Us3, Morphine, Booker T. & the M.G.'s, Greyboy and Medeski Martin & Wood alongside original compositions by John Lurie. The soundtrack was nominated for a Grammy Award (1997 - Best Instrumental Composition Written for a Motion Picture or for Television).

Production

Warren Beatty, Dustin Hoffman and Michael Keaton were offered the role of Chili Palmer but they all declined. Sonnenfeld considered Samuel L. Jackson for the role of Bo Catlett. Steve Buscemi and Matthew McConaughey were considered for the role of Ronnie Wingate.

Reception
On Rotten Tomatoes, the film holds an approval rating of 88% based on 56 reviews, with an average rating of 7.74/10. The site's critical consensus reads, "With a perfect cast and a sly twist on the usual Hollywood gangster dynamic, Get Shorty delivers a sharp satire that doubles as an entertaining comedy-thriller in its own right." On Metacritic, the film has a weighted average score of 82 out of 100, based on 22 critics, indicating "universal acclaim". Audiences surveyed by CinemaScore gave the film an average grade "B+" on scale of A+ to F.
The film was entered into the 46th Berlin International Film Festival.

The film opened at #1 upon its release (10/20-22) with $12.7 million. Get Shorty remained #1 for three consecutive weeks before being overtaken by Ace Ventura: When Nature Calls.

Accolades

For his role as Chili Palmer, John Travolta received the Golden Globe Award for Best Actor – Motion Picture Musical or Comedy.  The film also received nominations for the Golden Globe Award for Best Motion Picture – Musical or Comedy and the Screen Actors Guild Award for Outstanding Performance by a Cast in a Motion Picture.

References

External links

 
 
 
 

1995 films
1990s crime comedy films
1990s satirical films
American crime comedy films
American black comedy films
American satirical films
Films about Hollywood, Los Angeles
Films based on works by Elmore Leonard
Films based on American novels
Films directed by Barry Sonnenfeld
Films featuring a Best Musical or Comedy Actor Golden Globe winning performance
Films produced by Danny DeVito
Films set in Los Angeles
Films set in Miami
Mafia comedy films
Metro-Goldwyn-Mayer films
Films with screenplays by Scott Frank
1995 comedy films
1990s English-language films
1990s American films